Ruben Smith (born April 15, 1987) is a retired Norwegian professional ice hockey goaltender who last played for Stavanger Oilers in Norway's GET-ligaen. Up to the 2010/2011 season he played with the Storhamar Dragons of Norway's elite GET-ligaen. Smith joined the Storhamar organization in 2003 and played three seasons with their junior elite team. He made his professional debut during the 2005–06 season, appearing in 13 games and recording a goals against average of 0.50 and a save percentage of .973.

He backstopped the Dragons to the championship title in 2008, earning him the playoffs MVP trophy.

During the 2010 offseason he signed with the newly promoted Rosenborg of Trondheim.

International career
Smith was selected to play for the Norway men's national ice hockey team at the 2010 Winter Olympics. He has previously represented Norway at the 2006 and 2007 World Junior Ice Hockey Championships, and the 2008, 2009 and 2010 World Ice Hockey Championships.

External links

1987 births
Living people
Norwegian ice hockey goaltenders
Ice hockey players at the 2010 Winter Olympics
Olympic ice hockey players of Norway
Rosenborg IHK players
Sportspeople from Stavanger
Stavanger Oilers players
Storhamar Dragons players